Marmara serotinella is a moth of the family Gracillariidae. It is known from Virginia and Maine in the United States.

References

Gracillariinae
Moths described in 1915